D'Anthony Bell (born October 17, 1996) is an American football safety for the Cleveland Browns of the National Football League (NFL). He played college football at West Florida.

Professional career
Bell signed with the Cleveland Browns as an undrafted free agent on April 30, 2022, following the 2022 NFL Draft. He made the Browns' 53-man final roster out of training camp. In doing so he became the first player from West Florida to make it in the NFL.

References

External links
 Cleveland Browns bio
 West Florida Argonauts bio

1996 births
Living people
American football safeties
Players of American football from Georgia (U.S. state)
Cleveland Browns players
West Florida Argonauts football players
Iowa Central Tritons football players
Butler Grizzlies football players
Albany State Golden Rams football players